Artem Demkov (born 16 September 1989) is a Belarusian professional ice hockey forward who is currently playing for HC Dinamo Minsk in the Kontinental Hockey League (KHL).

Playing career
During the 2012–13 season, he briefly moved to the Hamburg Freezers of the Deutsche Eishockey Liga on 22 January 2013, after notching 106 points in 116 games for the Elmira Jackals. He then returned to the Jackals on a one-year contract on 29 July 2013.

Demkov returned to Europe on 11 July 2014, after successfully trialling for HC Sochi of the Kontinental Hockey League. After 11 games in Sochi, Demkov returned to former club, HC Dinamo Minsk.

On 24 July 2022, Demkov left Dinamo as a free agent and was signed to a one-year contract with Russian club, HC Spartak Moscow, for the 2022–23 season. Demkov was scoreless in 22 games with Spartak before he was returned to his homeland in transferring to HC Dinamo Minsk for the remainder of the season on 27 November 2022.

References

External links

1989 births
Acadie–Bathurst Titan players
Albany Devils players
Belarusian ice hockey forwards
Cape Breton Screaming Eagles players
Competitors at the 2011 Winter Universiade
Expatriate ice hockey players in Russia
HC Dinamo Minsk players
HC Sochi players
Elmira Jackals (ECHL) players
Hamburg Freezers players
Living people
HC Shakhtyor Soligorsk players
HC Spartak Moscow players
Ice hockey people from Minsk
Universiade medalists in ice hockey
Universiade silver medalists for Belarus
Yunost Minsk players
HKM Zvolen players
Belarusian expatriate sportspeople in Russia
Belarusian expatriate sportspeople in Canada
Belarusian expatriate sportspeople in the United States
Belarusian expatriate sportspeople in Germany
Belarusian expatriate sportspeople in Slovakia
Belarusian expatriate ice hockey people
Expatriate ice hockey players in the United States
Expatriate ice hockey players in Canada
Expatriate ice hockey players in Germany
Expatriate ice hockey players in Slovakia